Acrocercops eugeniella is a moth of the family Gracillariidae, known from Java, Indonesia, as well as Thailand. It was described by W. van Deventer in 1904. The hostplants for the species include Eugenia aquea, Eugenia cumini, and Eugenia javanica.

References

eugeniella
Moths of Asia
Moths described in 1904